Fidelity Southern Corporation  was a registered financial holding company headquartered in Atlanta, Georgia. It wholly owns Fidelity Bank and the LionMark Insurance Company. As of December 31, 2014, the Company had $3.1 billion in total assets, $265.0 million in total stockholders' equity, $2.5 billion in deposits and $2.6 billion in total loans.

Fidelity Bank provides an array of financial products and services for business and retail customers primarily in the metropolitan Atlanta and northern Florida markets. Various types of loans are also offered by the bank.

History
The bank was founded in DeKalb County in 1973 with the Fidelity Southern Corporation and Fidelity National Mortgage Corporation, formed in 1979.

Fidelity founded a brokerage firm in 1992.

On October 31, 1994, Fidelity Southern Corporation began trading on NASDAQ under the symbol "LION." 

Fidelity Bank acquired Decatur First Bank in 2011, the Security Exchange Bank in 2012, The Bank of Georgia in 2015, and American Enterprise Bank in 2017.

In July 2019, Ameris Bancorp merged with Fidelity Bank.

References

External links

Companies formerly listed on the Nasdaq
1973 establishments in Georgia (U.S. state)
American companies established in 1973
Financial services companies established in 1973
Banks established in 1973
Banks based in Georgia (U.S. state)
Financial services companies of the United States
Holding companies of the United States